Pernilla Stalfelt (born 1962) is a Swedish children's writer and illustrator. She has gained a reputation for successfully explaining difficult concepts to children in their own language, for example by presenting the Convention on the Rights of the Child in Hurrraa!!! All barns rätt (All Children's Rights). The Death Book, presenting death in children's terms obtained positive reviews when published in English in 2003.

Biography
Born in Helga Trefaldighets församling in Uppsala County on 22 February 1962, Stalfelt was the daughter of the journalist Sven Olov Stalfelt and Ann-Marie Stalfelt, a physician. Barbro Lindgren's Loranga, Masarin och Dartanjang inspired her to become a children's writer. On completing high school, she studied at Uppsala University in the cultural section.

In 1996, she published the first in a series of works for children with boken (book) in the title. These included Hårboken (The Hair Book, 1996), Bajsboken (The Poop Book, 1997), Dödenboken (The Death Book, 1999) and Kärlekboken (The Love Book, 2001). Stalfeld is also employed by Stockholm's Moderna Museet as a cultural advisor.

Selected publications

References

External links
Pernilla Stalfelt's website

1962 births
Living people
People from Uppsala County
Swedish writers
Swedish women illustrators
Swedish illustrators
Swedish children's writers
Swedish children's book illustrators
Swedish women children's writers
Uppsala University alumni